Brian William Cook is a British film director, assistant director, producer and actor.

Career
Cook has worked as a producer and assistant director on five films with Michael Cimino, three films with Stanley Kubrick and three with Sean Penn. His producing credits include The Pledge, Eyes Wide Shut and Waiting for the Barbarians. In 2005, he directed Colour Me Kubrick starring John Malkovich as Kubrick’s impostor Alan Conway. Cook has been known to make the occasional cameo in his films.

Personal life
Cook has two children.

Filmography

Films

References

British film directors
Living people
Year of birth missing (living people)
People from Hertfordshire